The Chicago Film Critics Association Award for Best Actor is an annual award given by the Chicago Film Critics Association.

Winners

1980s

1990s

2000s

2010s

2020s

References

Actor
Film awards for lead actor